Celerina railway station is a railway station in the municipality of Celerina/Schlarigna, in the Swiss canton of Graubünden. Half-hourly services operate on this section of the line.

Services
The following services stop at Celerina:

 Regio: limited service between Chur and St. Moritz.

References

External links
 
 

Railway stations in Switzerland opened in 1903
Railway stations in Graubünden
Rhaetian Railway stations